Judson Mills (born May 10, 1969) is an American actor. He is known for his performances as Texas Ranger Francis Gage in the American action drama television series Walker, Texas Ranger (1999–2001). Judson Mills joined the TV series in the second episode of Season 7 "Countdown" (together with Nia Peeples as his female partner Sydney Cooke). From 1991 to 1993, Mills performed as Alexander "Hutch" Hutchinson on As the World Turns. He also appeared on The X-Files and Disneys Mighty Joe Young as a supporting actor. Mills also appeared on episodes of Saving Grace as Ham's brother.

Early life and education
Mills was born in Washington, D.C. on May 10, 1969, and grew up in Northern Virginia. The house that he lived in was built by George Washington. The house is considered a national landmark. 

Although Mills did not originally plan to become an actor, he later started involving himself in the theater. During his high school years he attended New Hampshire's private independent High Mowing School.

Personal life
Mills has been married three times. First he was married to actress Christiaan Torrez on May 10, 1990. The couple was divorced in 1993. In 1997, he was married to Julie Mills, who gave birth to their son, Dalton Mills. Judson and Julie Mills were divorced five years later in 2002. On June 13, 2005, Judson Mills was married to Morgan Rae Mills, who then gave birth to their two sons Jagger Mills and Cash Mills. Mills's hobbies include hunting, fishing, football and Taekwondo.

Filmography

External links
 

1969 births
Living people
American male television actors
American male film actors
Waldorf school alumni